LKAL - Lietuvos Krepšinio A Lyga (English: Lithuanian Basketball A League), was the second Lithuanian basketball league until it ceased to exist in the spring of 2005.

The new created league named NKL, Nacionalinė Krepšinio Lyga (National Basketball League), replaced LKAL.

The prime league is Lietuvos Krepšinio Lyga.

Basketball leagues in Lithuania
Defunct basketball leagues in Europe
Second level basketball leagues in Europe

lt:LKAL